Trstenik is a village on the Pelješac peninsula in southern Dalmatia, Croatia. The population is 116 (census 2011).

History of Trstenik 

Trstenik's historical facts are connected closely to the European Phylloxera vine event.
The 'Great French Wine Blight' was a severe blight of the mid-19th century that destroyed many of the vineyards in France
and laid to waste the wine industry. The transfer of American vines and plants into Europe greatly increased
between roughly 1858 and 1862, and this is how the Phylloxera was accidentally introduced to Europe around 1860.
It is believed that the introduction of the blight-causing Phylloxera was not a problem before the advent of steamships,
which were faster and hence allowed the Phylloxera to survive the quicker ocean voyage.

At that time the vine growers in Dalmatia sold their grapes on the international market,
where the Phylloxera arrived with a nearly 40 years of delay.
Trstenik flourished in becoming a busy port for selling grapes to Italy and beyond.

Today Trstenik's capable wine makers are selling their outstanding wines to the international market
and of course again to some yachts anchored in Trstenik's pittoresque bay.

 
	
Populated places in Dubrovnik-Neretva County